13 Themes for a Triskaidekaphobic is a live album by The Jeff Kaiser Ockodektet, released in 2003 on pfMENTUM – CD013.

Credits 
Acoustic Guitar [Prepared] – Ernesto Diaz-Infante
Alto Saxophone – Jason Mears
Conductor, Trumpet, Composed By, Arranged By, Recorded By, Mastered By, Design, Layout – Jeff Kaiser
Contrabass – Hal Onserud, Jim Connolly
Drums – , Richie West
Electric Guitar – Tom McNalley
Electric Guitar, Electronics – G.E. Stinson
Euphonium, Valve Trombone – Eric Sbar
Flute [Flutes] – Emily Hay
Organ, Theremin, Electronics – Wayne Peet
Percussion – 
Percussion, Drums [Drum Set] – Richie West
Saxophone [Saxophones], Clarinet [Clarinets] – Lynn Johnston
Saxophone [Saxophones], Clarinet [Clarinets], Flute [Flutes] – Vinny Golia
Soprano Saxophone, Tenor Saxophone – Eric Barber
Trombone – 
Trumpet – Dan Clucas, 
Tuba – Mark Weaver

References 

2003 albums
Avant-garde jazz albums